Chalfant or Chalfants may refer to:

People
 Chalfant (surname)

Places
 Chalfant, California
 Chalfants, Ohio
 Chalfant, Pennsylvania